The 28 Regiment, Tennessee Infantry was an infantry regiment from Tennessee that served with the Confederate States Army in the American Civil War. Notable battles that the regiments has been engaged in include the Battle of Shiloh and the Battle of Chickamauga.

See also
List of Tennessee Confederate Civil War units

References

Further reading

Units and formations of the Confederate States Army from Tennessee
Military units and formations disestablished in 1865
1865 disestablishments in Tennessee